Daniel Carcillo (born January 28, 1985) is a Canadian former professional ice hockey left winger.  He most recently played under contract to the Chicago Blackhawks of the National Hockey League (NHL). His on-ice reputation as an enforcer has led to him being nicknamed "Car Bomb". Carcillo won a Stanley Cup as a member of the 2013 and 2015 Blackhawks. After retiring from the NHL in 2015, Carcillo created a non-profit organization that assists former NHL-players who are suffering from post-concussion syndrome and mental health issues. Carcillo is the founder and CEO of Wesana Health, a life sciences company that leverages psilocybin-based medicine to treat traumatic brain injuries.

Playing career
After being drafted 73rd overall in the 2003 NHL Entry Draft by the Pittsburgh Penguins, Carcillo was traded to the Phoenix Coyotes in exchange for Georges Laraque on February 27, 2007. During the 2007–08 regular season, he led the NHL with 324 penalty minutes.

Carcillo was traded to the Philadelphia Flyers on March 4, 2009, in exchange for Scottie Upshall and a 2011 second-round draft pick. His first goal as a Flyer came in Game 4 of the first round of the 2009 Stanley Cup playoffs against Pittsburgh.

Carcillo signed a one-year contract with the Chicago Blackhawks on July 1, 2011. Carcillo's  season came to an early end on January 2, 2012, in a game between the Blackhawks and the Edmonton Oilers. In that game, Carcillo was assessed a five-minute major penalty and a game misconduct for boarding and attempting to injure Oilers defenceman Tom Gilbert. Both Carcillo and Gilbert were injured on the play, and Carcillo was suspended for seven games. Carcillo, however, tore the anterior cruciate ligament (ACL) in his left knee on the play, and underwent surgery four days later, costing him the rest of the season. On March 12, 2012, Carcillo signed a two-year contract extension with the Blackhawks through to the 2013–14 season.

Carcillo was traded to the Los Angeles Kings on July 16, 2013, in exchange for a conditional sixth-round draft pick. He was then traded to the New York Rangers on January 4, 2014, for a conditional seventh-round draft pick in 2014. On May 23, 2014, Carcillo was automatically suspended ten games during the 2014 playoffs for using physical force against a linesman while being escorted to the penalty box. On June 3, 2014, Carcillo's suspension on appeal was reduced from ten games to six by NHL Commissioner Gary Bettman.

On September 4, 2014, the Pittsburgh Penguins signed Carcillo to a professional tryout contract in order to attend their 2014 training camp. He subsequently failed to make the team and was released. On October 3, 2014, Carcillo was added to the Chicago Blackhawks' training camp roster. He agreed to a one-year, one-way contract at the league minimum of $550,000 for his second stint with the club.

On January 16, 2015, Carcillo injured Winnipeg Jets' forward Mathieu Perreault while delivering a cross-check from behind after the play had been stopped. Perreault left the game and the NHL's Department of Player Safety issued Carcillo a six-game suspension and a fine of $40,243.92 for the hit. The incident marked the twelfth time Carcillo had been fined or suspended in nine NHL seasons. The Blackhawks won 2015 Stanley Cup, and although Carcillo did not make an appearance for the Blackhawks in the 2015 Stanley Cup playoffs, his name was still engraved on the Stanley Cup.

Carcillo's reckless style of play earned him the nickname "Car Bomb".

On September 17, 2015, Carcillo announced his retirement from professional hockey.

Personal life

Carcillo was the host of a music-focused 2011 radio program entitled The Bomb Shelter on WGN Radio 720 in Chicago.

Carcillo has admitted to battling alcohol and substance abuse problems throughout his professional career. Upon joining the Blackhawks, Carcillo became friends with Steve Montador, who was also trying to overcome a substance abuse problem. Montador helped Carcillo battle his alcohol and substance dependencies, but was forced to leave the NHL after sustaining a concussion in 2012. Carcillo remained friends with Montador until the latter's unexpected death in 2015. Montador's death deeply impacted Carcillo, who was also recovering from a concussion. He called for the NHL community to play a larger role in the lives of former players that have suffered concussions. After winning the Stanley Cup in 2015, Carcillo retired from playing professional hockey and established the 'Chapter 5 Foundation', which is dedicated to helping players who are struggling with post-concussion syndrome, anxiety, or depression. Carcillo later founded Wesana Health, which offers treatment for traumatic brain injury using psilocybin.

In November 2018, Carcillo indicated that as a rookie of the 2002-03 Sarnia Sting, he and other rookies were subjected to several forms of severe hazing, which crossed over into physical and sexual assault. Carcillo's accusations were corroborated by several other former Sting teammates, who joined him in a class-action lawsuit against the Canadian Hockey League in 2020.

Carcillo lives in Chicago with his wife, Ela, and three children.

Career statistics

Regular season and playoffs
Bold indicates led league

International

Awards and honours

References

External links

 

1985 births
Living people
Canadian ice hockey left wingers
Canadian sportspeople of Italian descent
Chicago Blackhawks players
Concussion activists
Ice hockey people from Ontario
Los Angeles Kings players
Mississauga IceDogs players
New York Rangers players
Philadelphia Flyers players
Phoenix Coyotes players
Pittsburgh Penguins draft picks
San Antonio Rampage players
Sarnia Sting players
Sportspeople from King, Ontario
Stanley Cup champions
Wheeling Nailers players
Wilkes-Barre/Scranton Penguins players